The Team relay race of the 2015 FIL World Luge Championships was held on 15 February 2015.

Results
The race was started at 14:08.

References

Team relay